{{DISPLAYTITLE:5-HT1F receptor}}

5-hydroxytryptamine (serotonin) receptor 1F, also known as HTR1F  is a   5-HT1 receptor protein and also denotes the human gene encoding it.

Agonists

 5-n-Butyryloxy-DMT: >60-fold selectivity versus 5-HT1E receptor
 BRL-54443 - mixed 5-HT1E/1F agonist
 Eletriptan - mixed 5-HT1B/1D/1E/1F/2B/7 agonist
 LY-334,370 - as well as related benzamides
 LY-344,864 (N-[(3R)-3-(Dimethylamino)-2,3,4,9-tetrahydro-1H-carbazol-6-yl]-4-fluorobenzamide)
 Naratriptan - mixed 5-HT1B/1D/1F agonist
 Lasmiditan - selective 5-HT1F agonist, a first-in-class ditan molecule

Antagonists

MLS000756415

See also 
 5-HT1 receptor
 5-HT receptor

References

Further reading

External links 
 
 

Serotonin receptors